Senator Stebbins may refer to:

Charles Stebbins (1789–1873), New York State Senate
De Wayne Stebbins (1835–1901), Wisconsin State Senate